Adedapo Paul Oluwaseun "Dapo" Awokoya-Mebude (born 29 July 2001) is a Scottish professional footballer who plays as a striker for Belgian club KV Oostende.

Early life
Mebude was born in London, growing up in Peckham, and is of Nigerian descent. His family moved to Scotland when he was around 10 years old, and he joined the Rangers youth system after attending an open Soccer Schools event organised by the club. He was later a participant in the SFA's Performance School programme at Holyrood Secondary School, and also attended Rangers' youth partnership school Boclair Academy.

Club career
Mebude turned professional with Rangers in May 2017. Mebude signed a new contract with the club in December 2018, keeping him at Ibrox until 2021. In February 2019 he was recalled from international duty with the Scotland under-19s to join up with the Rangers first team, due to injury problems. Mebude debuted for the first-team on 19 May 2019, in a 2–1 away defeat versus Kilmarnock in the league.

On 21 January 2021, Mebude joined Scottish Championship club Queen of the South on loan until the end of the season. He scored his first professional goal, in a 4–2 league win at Gayfield Park versus Arbroath on 6 March 2021.

In June 2021, Mebude ran out his contract with Rangers to become a free agent. A month later in July, he was signed by Watford on a two-year contract with the option of a further two-years. He suffered a back injury at the end of July 2021, and was hospitalised.

He moved on loan to AFC Wimbledon in August 2021. He scored his first goal for Wimbledon in a 3–3 draw against Bolton Wanderers on 14 August 2021.

In September 2022 he signed for Belgian club KV Oostende.

International career
Mebude has represented Scotland at under-16, under-17, under-18, under-19 youth levels, and made his first under-21 appearance in October 2021 against Denmark.

Style of play
In November 2018, he was described by the Daily Record as a "diminutive striker" who was "highly-rated within Ibrox" and that he was "known for his  quick pace as well as his obvious finishing ability and is a handful for defenders with his trickery". In a September 2019 interview, Mebude stated "When I play as a winger I try and be direct and score goals like Raheem Sterling  who is fast, direct and a similar build to me."

Personal life
In February 2021 Mebude was one of five Rangers players fined by Scottish police "for attending an illegal gathering of ten people in a flat" in breach of lockdown rules during the COVID-19 pandemic in the United Kingdom.

His younger brother Dire is also a footballer, who as of September 2020 was playing at youth level for Premier League club Manchester City, and Scotland.

References

External links

2001 births
Living people
Footballers from Greater London
English footballers
Scottish footballers
Scotland youth international footballers
Association football forwards
Rangers F.C. players
Queen of the South F.C. players
Watford F.C. players
AFC Wimbledon players
Scottish Professional Football League players
English Football League players
People educated at Holyrood Secondary School
Black British sportspeople
Scottish people of Nigerian descent
British sportspeople of Nigerian descent
English sportspeople of Nigerian descent
Scotland under-21 international footballers
K.V. Oostende players
Scottish expatriate footballers
Scottish expatriates in Belgium
Expatriate footballers in Belgium
Belgian Pro League players